Dazzi is a surname. Notable people with the surname include:

 Arturo Dazzi (1881–1966), Italian painter and sculptor
 Cecilia Dazzi (born 1969), Italian actress, television personality, and songwriter
 Romano Dazzi (1905–1976), Italian artist

See also
 Razzi (surname)

Italian-language surnames